Aleksey Mironovich Yachmenev (1866–1937) was an Aleut chief who lived in Unalaska. Along with Leontiy Sivtsov, Yachmenev accompanied Waldemar Jochelson on his 1909-1910 ethnological studies on the Aleut.

His son, John Yatchmeneff, wrote down the texts for John P. Harrington's 1941 work on the Aleut language.

References
 Bergsland, Knut (1994). Aleut Dictionary = Unangam Tunudgusii: an unabridged lexicon of the Aleutian, Pribilof, and Commander Islands Aleut language. Fairbanks, AK: Alaska Native Language Center, University of Alaska. . pg. viii

1866 births
1937 deaths
19th-century Native Americans
20th-century Native Americans
Alaska Native people
Aleut people
People from Unalaska, Alaska